Gwilym Edffrwd Roberts (7 August 1928 – 15 March 2018) was a British Labour Party politician, who was Member of Parliament for South Bedfordshire from 1966 to 1970, and for Cannock from February 1974 to 1983.

Early life
Roberts was educated at Brynrefail Grammar School and the University of Wales. He was a lecturer in scientific management techniques and served as a councillor on Luton Borough Council from 1965. He married Mair Griffiths in 1954.

Parliamentary career
Roberts contested Ormskirk in 1959 and Conway in 1964. He was Member of Parliament for South Bedfordshire from 1966 to 1970, and for Cannock from February 1974 to 1983.  Boundary changes that year changed his seat to Cannock and Burntwood, but he lost it in Labour's landslide defeat to the Conservative Gerald Howarth. He stood again in that constituency in 1987, but Howarth increased his majority.

After Parliament
Following his Westminster defeat he resumed his career in local government, serving as leader of Cannock Chase District Council, where he represented the Rugeley ward of Brereton and Ravenhill until losing his seat in 2002. He served as a Labour councillor on Staffordshire County Council, representing the Brereton and Ravenhill division, which incorporates a slightly larger area than the district council ward of the same name. He retired from membership of the County Council in 2010.

He continued to live in Rugeley with his wife until his death in 2018.

References

Sources
Times Guide to the House of Commons, 1966 & 1983

External links 
 

1928 births
2018 deaths
Alumni of the University of Wales
Councillors in Bedfordshire
Councillors in Staffordshire
Labour Party (UK) MPs for English constituencies
UK MPs 1966–1970
UK MPs 1974
UK MPs 1974–1979
UK MPs 1979–1983